Washington Jakoyo Midiwo (1966/1967 – 14 June 2021) was a Kenyan politician. He belonged to the Orange Democratic Party and was elected to represent the Gem Constituency in the National Assembly of Kenya from 2002 till 2017.

Education, Career 
He completed his primary level at Ndori Primary School. He later went to Sawagongo High School for higher education. Jakoyo Midiwo graduated from The University of  Nairobi (1979 to 1985). He is an MBA Accounting graduate.

Midiwo also served on several committees including;

 House Business Committee member from 2013.
 Catering and Health Club Committee from 2013
 Departmental Committee on Defense and Foreign Relations from 2013
 House Business Committee between 2008 and 2013
 Joint Committee on Parliamentary Broadcasting and Library from 2008 to 2013
 Departmental Committee on Finance, Planning and Trade from 2008 to 2013

Death 
Midiwo died following a Kidney failure on 14 June 2021 at the age of 54.

References

1950s births
2021 deaths
Members of the National Assembly (Kenya)
Year of birth missing
Orange Democratic Movement politicians
People from Siaya County